Driby is a village in the East Lindsey district of Lincolnshire, England. A former civil parish, it is now part of the parish of South Thoresby. It is in Alford.

Driby church was dedicated to Saint Michael, rebuilt in 1849–50, closed by the Diocese of Lincoln during the 20th century, and now a private house. It is a Grade II listed building.

References

External links

Villages in Lincolnshire
East Lindsey District
Former civil parishes in Lincolnshire